Necromancer is a 1988 American horror film directed by Dusty Nelson and starring Elizabeth Kaitan. The story follows a young woman who is raped by a group of men, and contacts a necromancer to exact her revenge.

Plot
Three friends, Paul, Carl and Allan break into their professor's office to steal the answers for an important test, what they do not know is that they are not alone.  Fellow student Julie Johnson is finishing some work when she spots Allan, it is not long before the three of them gang up on Julie.  While Carl holds her, Paul pulls out a knife and threatens to cut her, only to cut her underwear off and rape her as the others watch on, soon after they threaten and blackmail her to keep quiet.

The next day Julie is upset about the night before, she confides in her best friend Freda, who tries to talk her into going to the police but Julie refuses.  Later that day, Freda finds an advert in a paper advertising 'revenge'. She and Julie make inquiries into the advertisement, and they go to a house owned by a strange woman who casts a spell to summon a demon to exact vengeance against those who attacked Julie.

Cast
 Elizabeth Kaitan - Julie Johnson (credited as Elizabeth Cayton)
 John Tyler - Eric Freiden
 Rhonda Dorto] - Freda Lurch
 Stan Hurwitz - Paul DuShane
 Edward A. Wright - Carl Caulder
 Shawn Eisner - Allan
 Russ Tamblyn - Charles DeLonge
 Lois Masten - Necromancer
 David Flynn - David
 Lisa Randolph - Mary
 Lisa Beth Wilson - Linda
 Scott Harrison - Romeo
 Kieth Burns - Gus
 Carla Baron - Gail
 Jimmy Williams - Lecherous Guard
 Shannon McLeod - Edna
 Pamela Bunte - 1st Girl
 Kelly Ford - 2nd Girl
 Kelly Turner - Girl in Gallery
 Jonathan Jones - Boy #1
 Ed Neimeyer - Student #1
 Bill Whitefield - Student #2
 Karl Coleman - Student #3
 Tracey Ellis - Student #4
 Scott Ewing - Student #5
 Waide Aaron Riddle - Ernest

Reception
The film has received a negative critical reception.  On Rotten Tomatoes, the film has a "rotten" score of 22% and it holds a rating of 4.2/10 at the Internet Movie Database.

Home media
Necromancer was released in several countries on VHS format. In the United States, the film was released on DVD by Image Entertainment on September 26, 2000. Home distribution rights were later acquired by Millennium Entertainment, releasing the film on September 7, 2005.

In the United Kingdom, the film was initially available on VHS from CBS/Fox Video, while the DVD was made available via Lionsgate Home Entertainment on September 10, 2012.

Vinegar Syndrome released the film on Blu-ray in 2020.

Soundtrack
As of yet, the film's soundtrack has not been released. The film score was produced by Kevin Klingler and Music Pac Services Inc. Music for the soundtrack was produced by Jacaranda Music Inc.

The main soundtrack music includes:

 "Call of the Wild" - performed by Andy Landis  — Written by Andy Landis, Howard Benson and Steve Elliot.
 "Killer Love" - performed by Curt Cuomo  — Written by Judeth Randell, Curt Cuomo and Rick Buche.
 "Turnaround" - performed by Trapper  — Written by Richard Thibodeau (available from BMI Records).

References

External links
 

1988 films
1988 horror films
American supernatural horror films
American rape and revenge films
Demons in film
1980s English-language films
1980s American films